Lee Hyung-Sook (born 24 December 1964) is a South Korean former basketball player who competed in the 1984 Summer Olympics and in the 1988 Summer Olympics. She went on to work for Hankook Cosmetics (한국화장품), and then in 1992 quit that position to move to Taiwan and coach girls' high school basketball there. As of 2006, she worked at Pu-Men High School in Kaohsiung.

References

1964 births
Living people
South Korean women's basketball players
Olympic basketball players of South Korea
Basketball players at the 1984 Summer Olympics
Basketball players at the 1988 Summer Olympics
Olympic silver medalists for South Korea
Olympic medalists in basketball
South Korean expatriate sportspeople in Taiwan
Asian Games medalists in basketball
Basketball players at the 1986 Asian Games
Basketball players at the 1990 Asian Games
Medalists at the 1984 Summer Olympics
Asian Games gold medalists for South Korea
Asian Games silver medalists for South Korea
Medalists at the 1986 Asian Games
Medalists at the 1990 Asian Games
South Korean emigrants to Taiwan
South Korean women's basketball coaches